The Many Sides of Max is an album by American jazz drummer Max Roach featuring tracks recorded in 1959 but not released on the Mercury label until 1964.

Reception

Allmusic awarded the album 3 stars with its review by Scott Yanow stating "all seven selections on the admittedly brief album (around 31 minutes) are worth hearing".

Track listing
All compositions by Max Roach except as indicated
 "Prelude" (Consuela Lee) - 5:06    
 "Lepa" (Muhal Richard Abrams) - 2:08    
 "Connie's Bounce" (Lee) - 5:19    
 "A Little Sweet" - 3:05    
 "Tympanalli" - 4:52    
 "Bemsha Swing" (Denzil Best, Thelonious Monk) - 5:26    
 "There's No You" (Tom Adair, George Durgom, Hal Hopper) - 5:41

Personnel 
Max Roach - drums
Booker Little - trumpet
Julian Priester - trombone
George Coleman  - tenor saxophone
Art Davis - bass

References 

1959 albums
Max Roach albums
Mercury Records albums